John Slater Partridge (June 22, 1870 – May 20, 1926) was a United States district judge of the United States District Court for the Northern District of California.

Education and career

Born in Susanville, California, Partridge received an Artium Baccalaureus degree from the University of California, Berkeley in 1892 and an Artium Magister degree from the same institution in 1894. He read law to enter the bar in 1897, and was in private practice in San Francisco, California from then until 1904. He was an assistant city attorney of San Francisco from 1904 to 1905, ran unsuccessfully for mayor against Eugene Schmitz among others, and returned to his private practice from 1906 to 1923.

Federal judicial service

On March 2, 1923, Partridge was nominated by President Warren G. Harding to a new seat on the United States District Court for the Northern District of California created by 42 Stat. 837. He was confirmed by the United States Senate on March 3, 1923, and received his commission the same day. Partridge served in that capacity until his death on May 20, 1926.

References

Sources
 

1870 births
1926 deaths
Judges of the United States District Court for the Northern District of California
United States district court judges appointed by Warren G. Harding
20th-century American judges
United States federal judges admitted to the practice of law by reading law
People from Susanville, California